is a Japanese surname. Notable people with the surname include:

Alex Shibutani, American ice dancer
, Japanese table tennis player
, Japanese table tennis player
Maia Shibutani, American ice dancer
Shuu Shibutani, Japanese professional wrestler
Subaru Shibutani, lead singer of Japanese idol group Kanjani8
Toshihiro Shibutani, Japanese long-distance runner
Tamotsu Shibutani, Japanese-American sociologist

See also
Shibutani Kaidō (渋谷街道), a road connecting Kyōto and Yamashina
Shibutani Kōyama Tumulus (渋谷向山古墳), a circular shaped tumulus in Tenri, Nara
Shibutani, Ōsaka, a region within Ikeda, Ōsaka
Shibuya (disambiguation), an alternative way of reading 渋谷

Japanese-language surnames